Fengjian Village is a village in Xingtan Town, Shunde, Foshan, Guangdong, China with a total area of .

The village has a long history and features historic sites throughout. It has three stone arch bridges: the Juji and Mingyuan Bridges built in the Song Dynasty (9601279), and the Jin'ao Bridge, given building permission by the Kangxi Emperor during the Qing Dynasty (16441911). Ancient temples, shrines and houses abound amongst a network of rivers and streams. Due to comparisons of the local scenery with the noted sights of Zhouzhuang in Jiangsu province, the village is also known as the "Zhouzhuang of Shunde" (顺德周庄).

References

Shunde District
Villages in China